The Letter is a 1999 French-Portuguese drama film directed by Manoel de Oliveira. It tells the story of a married woman who has feelings for another man, and who confesses her feelings to her friend, a cloistered nun. The film is loosely based on the 1678 French novel The Princess of Cleves by Madame de Lafayette.

The film was entered into the 1999 Cannes Film Festival where it won the Jury Prize.

Synopsis 
This adaptation of the novel The Princess of Cleves is about the thwarted love of Catherine of Chartres who, after a disappointment in love, decides to marry a very famous doctor, Jacques de Cleves, without feeling any love for him. As a result, she falls in love with a fashionable singer, Pedro Abrunhosa. Before his death, Catherine's mother tries to separate her from the man she is in love with. After her mother's death, she finds herself torn between her desire to be with this singer and her desire to be faithful to her husband. A religious friend, to whom she confides, tries to help her to sort things out.

Cast
 Chiara Mastroianni as Mme de Clèves
 Pedro Abrunhosa as Pedro Abrunhosa
 Antoine Chappey as M. de Clèves
 Leonor Silveira as La religieuse
 Françoise Fabian as Mme de Chartres
 Maria João Pires as Maria João Pires
 Anny Romand as Mme de Silva
 Luís Miguel Cintra as M. Da Silva
 Stanislas Merhar as François de Guise
 Claude Lévèque as Le médecin de Mme de Chartres
 Ricardo Trêpa as Intrus
 Alain Guillo as Le directeur de Jouillerie
 Jean-Loup Wolff as Le médecin de l'hôpital
 Alexandre Nanaia
 Marcel Terroux as Le Jardinier

References

External links 
 
 

1999 films
1990s French-language films
1990s Portuguese-language films
1999 drama films
Films based on works by Madame de La Fayette
Films directed by Manoel de Oliveira
French multilingual films
Portuguese multilingual films
1990s French films